Krissanapoom Pibulsonggram (born 15 August 1996), nicknamed JJ and also known by the online alias Jaylerr, is a Thai actor, singer, and model. He became known from the 2013 film Grean Fictions and various television roles with Nadao Bangkok. He was a member of the Thai idol group Nine by Nine, and has since released several works with Nadao Music. He is the co-founder of QOW Entertainment.

Personal life and education
Krissanapoom was born on 15 August 1996 in Chiang Mai, Thailand. He is a great-grandson of former Prime Minister Plaek Phibunsongkhram. His parents are Pibulporn Pibulsonggram and Jamika Pibulsonggram, and he has a younger brother named Mahidol Pibulsonggram. He attended school at the Prince Royal's College before moving to Bangkok, where he studied and graduated from College of Social Communication Innovation, Srinakharinwirot University. He is currently in a relationship with Thai actress Kanyawee Songmuang.

Krissanapoom is vocal on social media over his criticisms of the Thai government's response to the 2020-2021 Thai protests and its handling of the COVID-19 pandemic. Thai news agency The Standard recognized him as one of the "Powerful Voices in Crisis" for his influence on the new generation of pop culture fans to actively use social media to raise social and political issues.

Career

2013–2017: Early acting roles
He first became known among online social media users following a modelling event for CentralPlaza Chiang Mai Airport, after which he was approached by Chookiat Sakveerakul to cast for his first acting role in Grean Fictions. He then had various acting roles for television in shows such as Carabao The Series, Love Blood, Grean House The Series, Fly to Fin, and Dead Time Stories.

After signing with Nadao Bangkok in 2015, he became more widely known for his projects such as Diary of Tootsies (2016), which was followed by the web mini-series I Hate You, I Love You (2016), Diary of Tootsies Season 2 (2017), and Project S: The Series (2017). He also starred in the movie Suddenly Twenty (2016).

2018–2019: Nine by Nine and Human Error
From 2018 to 2019, Krissanapoom took part in a special project by Nadao Bangkok and 4Nologue called Nine by Nine. The project aims to develop nine individual members into a boy group. Nine by Nine have released their mini-album in 2019 composed of five songs: "Night Light", "Hypnotize", "The Lucky One", "Shouldn't", and "Eternity". The members also starred as main roles in the television series In Family We Trust (2018) and Great Men Academy (2019).

After the Nine by Nine project, Krissanapoom was tapped for another project called "Human Error" in partnership of GMM Grammy, LINE TV and Nadao Music with his co-members in Nine by Nine namely, Paris Intarakomalyasut (Ice) and Chonlathorn Kongyingyong (Captain). He sang "Empty King" and starred in a short film entitled Blue as part of the project.

2020–2021: Nadao Music

In 2020, Nadao Music paired him with Paris Intarakomalyasut to form a duo named Jaylerr x Paris (later known as Jaylerr x Ice Paris). As of July 2021, the duo has made three original songs under the label namely, "Unexpected", "Nude", and "Feels Like a Year". They also appeared in an online web musical series entitled Jaylerr x Ice Paris Studio Session where they covered songs from other Thai music artists.

As a soloist, he has released his first EP entitled PASSION + PATIENCE on 1 October 2020, with an exclusive release deal with Apple Music. He said that the title of the album, with the words "passion" and "patience" drive him throughout his career. He further says that by doing things with passion and having patience to reach every goal he has set. The album has five songs in it such as "Nimman", "Very Very Sorry", "Balcony", "Your Number", and "Celebrate!", all written and composed by Krissanapoom.

In September 2021, Krissanapoom announced that he terminated his contract with Nadao Music to explore more musical and artistic styles. His duo with Paris was also discontinued as a result. He briefly stayed as an artist under Nadao Bangkok, until December 2021.

2022–present: QOW Entertainment

After his departure from Nadao Bangkok, Krissanapoom has announced that together with his girlfriend Kanyawee, they have formed their own entertainment and talent agency named QOW Entertainment. The agency will be handling the pair's local and international projects. They have collaborated with 4Nologue CEO Anuwat Wichiennarat to co-manage and further expand the agency in hopes of hiring more artists in the coming years.

In 2022, he is set to play the lead role in Forbidden, the first Thai-language original series from HBO Asia. The series has been selected to premiere at the 26th Busan International Film Festival.

On October 1, Krissanapoom released his collaborative single with the Thai girl group 4EVE, entitled "My Duty". This is his first single under QOW Entertainment.

Filmography

Films

Television series

Web series

Discography

References

External links

Krissanapoom Pibulsonggram
Krissanapoom Pibulsonggram
Krissanapoom Pibulsonggram
Krissanapoom Pibulsonggram
Krissanapoom Pibulsonggram
1996 births
Living people